John Williams (born 1901, date of death unknown) was an English professional footballer who played as a centre forward.

References

1901 births
English footballers
Association football forwards
Burnley F.C. players
Rossendale United F.C. players
Bacup Borough F.C. players
English Football League players
Year of death missing